Anna Mrozińska (born 25 November 1985) is a retired Polish rhythmic gymnast who competed at the 2004 Olympics and the 2003 Gymnastic World Championship She retired from her professional career in 2006.

Coaching career 
Anna Mrozińska is currently coaching Natalia Koziol, who is an emerging Polish gymnast.

References

External links 
 Anna Mrozińska Biography in Polish

Living people
1985 births
Polish rhythmic gymnasts
Sportspeople from Gdynia
Olympic gymnasts of Poland
Gymnasts at the 2004 Summer Olympics